Mladá Vožice is a town in Tábor District in the South Bohemian Region of the Czech Republic It has about 2,700 inhabitants.

Administrative parts
Villages of Bendovo Záhoří, Blanice, Chocov, Dolní Kouty, Dubina, Horní Kouty, Janov, Krchova Lomná, Noskov, Pavlov, Radvanov, Staniměřice, Stará Vožice and Ústějov are administrative parts of Mladá Vožice.

Geography
It lies mostly in the Vlašim Uplands. The town is situated on the river Blanice. There are several fish ponds in the territory, the largest of them is Podhradní.

History

The area of today's Mladá Vožice began to settle between 711 and 796. Duke Spytihněv I founded here a castle for storing gold and silver which were mined here. The first written mention of Mladá Vožice is from 1273, when the probable first owner of the settlement, Stanimír of Vožice, was mentioned.

Vožice goods were probably owned by the royal chamber but were frequently pawned or lent to feudal lords for services to the king. One of the first ones was Vilém of Vožice who possessed the estate until 1318. From 1318 to 1425 Vožice was owned by the lords of Landštejn, Janovice, Orlík, Pacov and Ronov houses.

In March 1420, after the Battle of Sudoměř, Vožice was occupied by about 2,000 horse riders led by Mikeš Divůček of Jemniště, the master of the Kutná Hora mint. On Great Friday morning 1420, Jan Žižka attacked the town and set it on fire. Many lords were captured or killed and just those who had escaped to the castle got away with their lives. Žižka also seized a lot of horses for his army. In September 1425, the Hussites conquered the castle after five weeks' besiegement. They had the castle destroyed and the town was attached to Vlašim estate. The castle was never renewed. Mladá Vožice was then owned by many feudal houses.

In 1678 the estate changed owners for the Küenburg family, who adjoined other smaller possessions in the area and established it a hereditary estate. The Küenburg family owned Mladá Vožice until the abolition of serfdom.

20th century
The town and neighbourhood of Mladá Vožice was a purely agricultural area until 1945, and the change towards industrialization only began after the liberation. Until 1947 Mladá Vožice had been a court district in the political Tábor District.

Since 1949, after the change in the political and state system, Mladá Vožice was included in the newly established district of Votice in Prague Region. After the land reorganization of 1960 Mladá Vožice fell under the Tábor District in the South Bohemian Region. In 1975–1980, small villages and hamlets were merged with the town of Mladá Vožice into one municipality but in 1990, Běleč, Hlasivo, Řemíčov and Vilice became independent municipalities again.

Demographics

Sights

Existence of the Church of Saint Martin was first documented in 1348. After it dilapidated, a new Baroque church was built in 1794. It is situated on a reinforced terrace above the Žižkovo Square. All the church bells were seized in 1942 except for the passing bell; the bell called Jan was returned and blessed as late as 1952 and three new bells, Maria, Václav and Martin sounding Gloria in concord, were bought thanks to fund-raising in 1986.

A castle was built in the same square between 1570 and 1603. It was rebuilt to its present Baroque form by the Küenburg family, who owned it from 1678 to 1945. In 1946 the castle was confiscated and its interiors were used by the Koh-i-Noor factory.

The Chapel of the Assumption of the Virgin Mary is situated on top of a hill above the town, on the site of the former castle. It was built by Krištof Karel Přehořovský of Kvasejovice, the owner of the Vožice estate, in 1646.

Notable people
Matthias of Janov (1350/55–1393/94), ecclesiastical writer
August Sedláček (1843–1926), historian and archivist
Ota Bubeníček (1871–1962), landscape painter; lived here from 1932
Fran Lhotka (1883–1962), Czech-Croatian composer and musician

Gallery

References

External links

 

Cities and towns in the Czech Republic
Populated places in Tábor District